Hearts of the West, released in Europe as Hollywood Cowboy, is a 1975 American comedy film directed by Howard Zieff, released by Metro-Goldwyn-Mayer and starring Jeff Bridges, Andy Griffith, Blythe Danner, and Alan Arkin. Set in 1930s Hollywood, the story revolves around a wannabe Western writer who finds himself cast as a leading man in several B-movie Westerns.

Despite good reviews, the film was a financial  disappointment for MGM upon release in 1975, but it has since developed a significant cult following from midnight showings and college campus screenings.

Screenwriter Rob Thompson launched his career with this film. He went on to be a major creative talent on the television series Northern Exposure (for which he won an Emmy) and Monk.

Plot

In 1933, Lewis Tater (Jeff Bridges), an aspiring novelist who harbors dreams of becoming the next Zane Grey, decides to leave his family home in Iowa to go to the University of Titan in Nevada so he can soak up the western atmosphere. He arrives to find that there is no university, only a mail order correspondence course scam run by two crooks out of the local hotel. He tries to spend the night at the hotel, but is attacked by one of the men in an attempted robbery. He escapes his attacker, grabs his suitcase, and steals their car to get away, but after a while it runs out of gas. He looks in the car trunk, and finds a toolbox containing a revolver and ammunition. Afraid the two crooks are still in pursuit of him, he takes the tool box and his suitcase and walks off into the desert.

Wandering and exhausted, the next morning he happens upon a threadbare film-unit from Tumbleweed Productions grinding out a "B" western. Later that day, he catches a lift with the cowboy actors to Los Angeles. After applying for work at Tumbleweed, he is referred by crusty old extra Howard Pike (Andy Griffith) to the Rio, a western-themed restaurant. While washing dishes at the Rio, he is called by Tumbleweed, where Howard mentors him to be an actor. After proving himself as a stuntman, unit manager Kessler (Alan Arkin) offers him a speaking role. Tater then falls in love with spunky script girl Miss Trout (Blythe Danner). Meanwhile, the crooks trace him to Los Angeles to retrieve the safe-box containing their money that was in the car stolen by Lewis.

Cast
 Jeff Bridges as Lewis Tater aka Neddy Wales
 Andy Griffith as Howard Pike aka Billy Pueblo
 Donald Pleasence as A.J. Neitz
 Blythe Danner as Miss Trout
 Alan Arkin as Bert Kessler
 Richard B. Shull as Stout Crook
 Herbert Edelman as Polo
 Alex Rocco as Earl
 Frank Cady as Pa Tater
 Anthony James as Lean Crook
 Burton Gilliam as Lester
 Matt Clark as Jackson
 Candy Azzara as Waitress
 Thayer David as Bank Manager
 Marie Windsor as Hotel Manager
 Anthony Holland as Guest at Beach Party
 Dub Taylor as Ticket Agent
 William Christopher as Bank Teller
 Stuart Nisbet as Lucky
 Tucker Smith as Noodle in Pith Helmet
 Richard Stahl as Barber
 Granville Van Dusen as World War I Pilot

Reception
Roger Ebert called it "a lovely little comedy, a movie to feel fond of" and that Bridges "brings a nice complexity to the role".

Awards
It was named one of the National Board of Review's Top Ten Films for 1975. Arkin won the New York Film Critics Circle Award for Best Supporting Actor.

See also
 List of American films of 1975

References

External links
 
 
 
 

1975 films
1970s Western (genre) comedy films
American Western (genre) comedy films
1970s English-language films
Films about actors
Films about filmmaking
Films about Hollywood, Los Angeles
Films about writers
Films directed by Howard Zieff
Films scored by Ken Lauber
Films set in Los Angeles
Films set in Nevada
Films set in 1933
Metro-Goldwyn-Mayer films
1975 comedy films
1970s American films